Mapson is a surname. Notable people with the surname include:

Jo-Ann Mapson, American author
Johnny Mapson (1917–1999), British footballer

See also
Manson
Masson (surname)